Nutritional yeast (also known as nooch) is a deactivated yeast, often a strain of Saccharomyces cerevisiae, that is sold commercially as a food product. It is sold in the form of yellow flakes, granules, or powder and can be found in the bulk aisle of most natural food stores. It is popular with vegans and vegetarians and may be used as an ingredient in recipes or as a condiment.

It is a significant source of some B-complex vitamins and contains trace amounts of several other vitamins and minerals. Sometimes nutritional yeast is fortified with vitamin B12, another reason it is popular with vegans.

Nutritional yeast has a strong flavor that is described as nutty or cheesy, which makes it popular as an ingredient in cheese substitutes. It is often used by vegans in place of cheese, in, for example, mashed and fried potatoes or scrambled tofu, or as a topping for popcorn.

In Australia, it is sometimes sold as "savoury yeast flakes". In New Zealand, it has long been known as Brufax. Though "nutritional yeast" usually refers to commercial products, inadequately fed prisoners of war have used "home-grown" yeast to prevent vitamin deficiency.
Nutritional yeast is a whole-cell inactive yeast that contains both soluble and insoluble parts, which is different from yeast extract. Yeast extract is made by centrifuging inactive nutritional yeast and concentrating the water soluble yeast cell proteins which are rich in glutamic acid, nucleotides, and peptides, the flavor compounds responsible for umami taste.

Commercial production 
Nutritional yeast is produced by culturing a yeast in a nutrient medium for several days. The primary ingredient in the growth medium is glucose, often from either sugarcane or beet molasses. When the yeast is ready, it is deactivated with heat and then harvested, washed, dried and packaged. The species of yeast used is often a strain of Saccharomyces cerevisiae. The strains are cultured and selected for desirable characteristics and often exhibit a different phenotype from strains of S. cerevisiae used in baking and brewing.

Nutrition 
Nutritional values for nutritional yeast vary from one manufacturer to another. On average, two tablespoons (about 30 ml) provides 60 calories with five grams of carbohydrates and four grams of fiber. A serving also provides 9 grams of protein, which is complete protein, providing all nine amino acids the human body cannot produce. Nutritional yeast can be classified into fortified and unfortified. While both kinds provide iron, fortified yeast provides 20 percent of the recommended daily value, while unfortified yeast provides only 5 percent. Unfortified nutritional yeast provides from 35 to 100 percent of vitamins B1 and B2.

Since nutritional yeast is often used by vegans who may be interested in supplementing their diets with vitamin B12, there has been confusion about the source of the B12 in nutritional yeast. Yeast cannot produce B12, which is naturally produced only by some bacteria. Some brands of nutritional yeast, though not all, are fortified with vitamin B12. When it is fortified, the vitamin B12 (commonly cyanocobalamin) is produced separately and then added to the yeast.

Environmental concerns
Production of nutritional yeast releases acetaldehyde, which can be seen as a volatile organic compound (VOC). Acetaldehyde is a chemical similar in both chemistry and toxicity to formaldehyde. The National Emission Standards for Hazardous Air Pollutants (NESHAP) for this sector was proposed in 1998 and promulgated in 2001. In these actions, the EPA identified acetaldehyde as the hazardous air pollutant (HAP) emitted in the largest quantities from the manufacturing of nutritional yeast classified as a carcinogen although not a component of the finished product.

See also 

 Marmite
 Vegan cheese
 Vegemite

References

External links 
Environmental rules for the manufacture of nutritional yeast

Condiments
Food additives
Umami enhancers
Vegan cuisine
Yeasts